Kevin L. Thurm (born April 5, 1961 in Brooklyn, New York) is an American politician, lawyer and  former government official, who is the current chief executive officer of the Clinton Foundation. He previously served as deputy secretary and chief of staff for the Department of Health and Human Services under Secretary Donna Shalala.

Education
 Bachelor's from Tufts University in 1983
 Bachelor's/Master's from Oxford University in 1986 (Rhodes Scholar)
 J.D. from Harvard Law School in 1989

References

United States Department of Health and Human Services officials
Clinton administration personnel
American lawyers
Clinton Foundation people
People from Brooklyn
Alumni of the University of Oxford
Harvard Law School alumni
American Rhodes Scholars
Tufts University alumni
1961 births
Living people